Kumho Tire (formerly known as Samyang Tire) is a South Korean tire manufacturer. It is a subsidiary of Chinese tire conglomerate . Kumho Tire was previously operated as a business unit of the Kumho Asiana Group.

Operations

An industrial conglomerate chaebol, Kumho Tire manufactures a full range of tire under the Kumho, Marshal & Zetum brands.

Kumho Tire runs three manufacturing facilities in South Korea: the Pyeongtaek Plant, the Gokseong Plant and the Gwangju Plant which includes the Kumho Research and Development center mentioned below. There are a further three plants in China: the Tianjin Plant, the Gaoxin Plant (in Nanjing) and the Changchun Plant. There is also one plant in Vietnam in the Binh Duong Province and one plant in the United States (Macon, Georgia).

Kumho Tire exports tires worldwide and has a global network of sales organizations.

It has three centers for research and development, with the largest in Gwangju, South Korea. The other two centers are in Akron, Ohio and Birmingham, England. These service the US and European tire markets respectively. Other research centers are located in Buchholz (Germany) and Tianjin (China).

Kumho Tyre (UK) Ltd (a subsidiary of Kumho Tire Co., Inc.) was created in 1977. Administrative functions are based in Sutton, Surrey and the marketing department is operated from Birmingham.

On 15 March 2011, China Central Television (CCTV) reported that there were serious irregularities in the tire production process of Kumho tires. It reported that Kumho used excessive amounts of recycled rubber as raw materials to reduce costs, which could lead to the sidewall of tires to bulge and potentially rupture. Soon after the program was aired, Kumho Tires released a statement denying the claims. It explained that the proportion of recycled rubber should be calculated by weight, not by quantity, and that 'it was inaccurate to rely on video footage to determine the quality of tires'. On 21 March 2011, the president of Kumho Tire  (Kim Jong-ho), and the president of Kumho Tire China (Li Hanxie) released an official statement of apology through CCTV, and issued a recall of all the affected products.

In 2017, it was announced that Chinese tire manufacturer  would acquire the majority stake in Kumho Tire. The deal was finalised in 2018, and the company then exited from Kumho Asiana Group in the process.

Sponsorships
In 2007, Kumho became a Platinum Partner of the Manchester United Football Club. The company is classed as an Official Club Sponsor. In partnership with Manchester United, Kumho launched a "Play Safer" campaign designed to increase youth road safety awareness.

The company also sponsors other motoring events such as European Formula 3 racing.

On February 13, 2014, Darren Rovell of ESPN announced on his Twitter page that Kumho was named the official tire of the NBA.

Kumho Tire is one of the sponsors of the La Liga.

Associates
Daehan Tire since 1991.

See also

 Kumho BMW Championship
 Kumho Tire Co. v. Carmichael
 List of Korean companies

References

External links
 Official website

Tire manufacturers of South Korea
Companies based in Gwangju
Automotive companies established in 1960
Auto parts suppliers of South Korea
South Korean brands
South Korean companies established in 1960